Kamień is a studio album by Polish singer Kayah, released in 1995 by Zic Zac and BMG Poland. It was a critical and commercial success and spawned one of Kayah's biggest hits, "Fleciki".

Background
Although Kamień was Kayah's second studio album, the singer considers it her 'proper' debut album, excluding the 1988 self-titled LP from her official discography. Kayah wrote and co-produced all material on Kamień which musically is a blend of pop, soul and jazz. The album was supported by four singles: "Jak liść" and "Nawet deszcz" in 1995, followed by "Fleciki" and "Santana" in 1996.

Kamień was an unexpected commercial success, earning gold certification in Poland. It was also well received by music critics and earned a nomination to the Fryderyk award as the Pop Album of the Year.

Track listing
 "Nawet deszcz" – 6:17
 "Tam będę" – 3:35
 "Bo czasem" – 3:36
 "Pod tym samym niebem" – 4:27
 "Ja chcę ciebie" – 7:11
 "Smutna kobieta" – 5:58
 "Fleciki" – 5:02
 "Jak liść" – 4:57
 "Cień anioła stróża" – 5:18
 "Santana" – 4:40
 "Jestem kamieniem" – 3:20
 "Cień anioła stróża" (Remix) – 5:18
 "Jestem kamieniem" (Remix) – 3:20
 "Ja chcę ciebie" (Remix) – 7:14

Charts

Certifications

References

External links
 Official audio stream on YouTube
 Kamień on Discogs

1995 albums
Kayah (singer) albums
Polish-language albums